The New Orleans Ladies Stakes is an American Thoroughbred horse race created in 2010 at Fair Grounds Race Course in New Orleans, Louisiana to attract 2009 American Horse of the Year Rachel Alexandra to train and compete there. A $200,000 stakes raced in mid March, it is open to fillies and mares, age three and older. It is contested on dirt at a distance of  a mile and a sixteenth (8.5 furlongs).

The name of the race comes from the 1978 song of the same title written by Hoyt Garrick and Leon Medica and originally recorded by Louisiana Music Hall of Fame rock band, LeRoux.

The inaugural running was won by Zardana with Rachel Alexandra finishing second.

The purse for its 2011 running was $100,000.  It was raised to $150,000 for 2012.

Winners

References

Fair Grounds Race Course
Ungraded stakes races in the United States
Horse races in New Orleans
Horse racing
Mile category horse races for fillies and mares
Recurring sporting events established in 2010
2010 establishments in Louisiana